Michael Haydn's Symphony No. 17 in E major, Perger 44, Sherman 17, MH 151, is believed to have been written in Salzburg after 1771. It is the third of four E major symphonies formerly attributed to Joseph Haydn.

Scored for 2 flutes, 2 oboes, 2 bassoons, 2 horns and strings, in four movements:

Allegro
Andante (in A major)
Menuetto and Trio (with the Trio in E minor)
Allegro con spirit

Horns in E are used in the whole piece except for the Andante (oboes stay) and the Trio (has a flute solo).

References
 A. Delarte, "A Quick Overview Of The Instrumental Music Of Michael Haydn" Bob's Poetry Magazine November 2006: 35 - 36 PDF
 Charles H. Sherman and T. Donley Thomas, Johann Michael Haydn (1737 - 1806), a chronological thematic catalogue of his works. Stuyvesant, New York: Pendragon Press (1993)
 C. Sherman, "Johann Michael Haydn" in The Symphony: Salzburg, Part 2 London: Garland Publishing (1982): lxv - lxvi

Symphony 17
Compositions in E major